The 2002–03 Polish Cup was the forty-ninth season of the annual Polish cup competition. It began on 5 August 2002 with the Preliminary Round and ended on 14 May 2003 with second leg of the Final, played at Stadion Wisły Płock, Płock. The winners qualified for the qualifying round of the UEFA Cup. Wisła Kraków were the defending champions.

Preliminary round 
The matches took place on 5 and 6 August 2002.

! colspan="3" style="background:cornsilk;"|5 August 2002

|-
! colspan="3" style="background:cornsilk;"|6 August 2002

|}

Round 1 
The matches took place on 28 August 2002.

! colspan="3" style="background:cornsilk;"|28 August 2002

|}

Round 2 
The matches took place on 10, 11 and 25 September 2002.

! colspan="3" style="background:cornsilk;"|10 September 2002

|-
! colspan="3" style="background:cornsilk;"|11 September 2002

|-
! colspan="3" style="background:cornsilk;"|25 September 2002

|}

Round 3 
The matches took place between 11 and 30 October 2002.

! colspan="3" style="background:cornsilk;"|11 October 2002

|-
! colspan="3" style="background:cornsilk;"|16 October 2002

|-
! colspan="3" style="background:cornsilk;"|23 October 2002

|-
! colspan="3" style="background:cornsilk;"|30 October 2002

|}

Quarter-finals 
The first legs took place on 6 November, when the second legs took place on 30 November and 1 December 2002.

|}

Semi-finals 
The first legs took place on 16 April, when the second legs took place on 23 April 2003.

|}

Final

First leg

Second leg 

Wisła Kraków won 3–1 on aggregate

References

External links 
 90minut.pl 

Polish Cup seasons
Polish Cup
Cup